The Bratt System was a system that was used in Sweden (1919–1955) and similarly in Finland (1944–1970) to control alcohol consumption, by rationing of liquor. Every citizen allowed to consume alcohol was given a booklet called a motbok (viinakortti in Finland), in which a stamp was added each time a purchase was made at Systembolaget (in Sweden) and Alko (in Finland). The stamps were based on the amount of alcohol bought. When a certain amount of alcohol had been bought, the owner of the booklet had to wait until next month to buy more. 

The rations were gradually changed, but were issued in greater quantities to men (due to the lesser effects incurred on a male of equal or lesser weight) and citizens of titles and professions associated with a higher social standing. Citizens made frequent use of friends' or even strangers' booklets, for example by rewarding a young woman with a dinner out in return for the other party consuming most or all of the alcohol incurring the stamps. Wine was exempt from rationing, as it was considered less dangerous, with little or no correlation to alcohol-related abuse or violence.

Named after medical doctor and liberal politician Ivan Bratt (sv), the Bratt system, involving the motbok/viinakortti, was made permanent in 1922 after a referendum on a total ban on alcohol had been held. In said referendum, a narrow 51% had voted no to banning alcohol sales. Its primary purpose was to decrease the consumption of alcohol. While a motbok owner could buy almost unlimited amounts of wine, spirits were highly restricted.

As of 31 December 1948, the average purchase amount allowed per motbok per month was 1.82 litres of spirits.

Sources
Nationalencyklopedin, 2007

See also

 1922 Swedish prohibition referendum
 Alcoholic beverages in Sweden

Regulation in Sweden
Alcohol in Sweden
Alcohol law
Rationing by country
20th-century establishments in Sweden